Superstars, published in France in 2000 by Flammarion and translated in several languages, is the second novel by Ann Scott. Relating the tales of the techno culture emerging in France and in Europe in the late nineties, this pop novel instantly gave its author a cult status.

Plot summary 
This novel, set in Paris, portrays the economically bleak and emotionally taut lives of three roommates craving for artistic recognition and fame. Evolving in the trends of glamorous parties, borderline sex and designer drugs, Louise, the main character, just turned thirty, is facing an identity crisis. Now working as a techno deejay and a producer, she used to be a bass player for rock bands. Entering the world of electronic music and raves, she also became bisexual. Now she's wondering where this is all leading her.

Literary significance 
An entire generation found itself represented in these dilemmas of heterosexual vs bisexual identity and rock vs techno tastes.

This novel pays a tribute to seventies rock musicians such as The Rolling Stones, eighties punk musicians such as Johnny Thunders or The Ramones, and worldwide known deejays such as Jeff Mills, Derrick May, Kevin Saunderson, DJ Rush. It also pays tribute to French female deejay DJ Sextoy who died in 2002.

Its pop content of music, arts, fashion, sex and drugs turned it into a bestseller in France.

The novel was criticized by some gay and lesbians associations in France who felt that Ann Scott was depicting a very ironic portrait of gay behaviors and gay people in general. Ann Scott declared that being bisexual brings some kind of balance to her life, but that the gay relationships she's been in were all rather pathological for her. 

A movie is on the way.

Footnotes

Editions 
 Hardback : Editions Flammarion, October 2000
 Paperback : Editions J'ai lu, April 2002

2000 French novels
French-language novels
Novels set in Paris
Éditions Flammarion books